Najas, the water-nymphs or naiads, is a genus of aquatic plants. It is cosmopolitan in distribution, first described for modern science by Linnaeus in 1753.  Until 1997, it was rarely placed in the Hydrocharitaceae, and was often taken as constituting (by itself) the family Najadaceae.

The APG II system, of 2003 (unchanged from the APG system, of 1998), places the genus in family Hydrocharitaceae, in the order Alismatales of the monocots.

An infrageneric classification of two sections is proposed: Section Americanae and sect. Caulinia.

Species
 Najas affinis Rendle - South America, Senegal, Guinea-Bissau
 Najas ancistrocarpa A.Braun ex Magnus - China, Japan, Taiwan
 Najas arguta Kunth - Cuba, Costa Rica, Panama, South America
 Najas australis Bory ex Rendle - India, Madagascar, Mauritius, KwaZulu-Natal, Seychelles
 Najas baldwinii Horn - West Africa
 Najas brevistyla Rendle - Assam
 Najas browniana Rendle - southern China, India, Taiwan, Java, Cavern Island in Northern Territory of Australia
 Najas chinensis N.Z.Wang - Primorye, China, Taiwan, Japan
 Najas conferta (A.Braun) A.Braun - Cuba, Hispaniola, Panama, Brazil
 Najas faveolata A. Br. ex Magnus
 Najas filifolia R.R.Haynes - southeastern United States (Georgia, Alabama, Florida)
 Najas flexilis (Willd.) Rostk. & W.L.E. Schmidt (1824)  - temperate Northern Hemisphere
 Najas gracillima (A.Braun ex Engelm.) Magnus - Asia, North America
 Najas graminea Delile (1813) - Africa, Asia, New Guinea, Melanesia, northern Australia; naturalized in California and parts of Europe
 Najas grossareolata L.Triest - Sri Lanka
 Najas guadalupensis (Spreng.) Magnus - North and South America, Caribbean
 Najas hagerupii Horn - Ghana, Mali
 Najas halophila L.Triest - Java, New Guinea, Queensland
 Najas heteromorpha Griff. ex Voigt - eastern India
 Najas horrida A.Braun ex Magnus - Africa, Madagascar, Sinai
 Najas indica (Willd.) Cham. (1829) - Indian Subcontinent, China, Southeast Asia, New Guinea
 Najas kurziana  Rendle - Bihar, East Timor
 Najas madagascariensis Rendle - Madagascar; naturalized in Mauritius
 Najas malesiana W.J.de Wilde - India, Bangladesh, Indochina, Malaysia, Indonesia, Philippines; naturalized in eastern Brazil
 Najas marina L. (1753) - widespread and nearly cosmopolitan
 Najas minor All. (1773) - widespread in Europe, Asia, Africa; naturalized in eastern North America
 Najas oguraensis Miki - East Asia, Himalayas (Pakistan, Nepal, northern India)
 Najas pectinata (Parl.) Magnus - Sahara
 Najas pseudogracillima L.Triest - Hong Kong
 Najas rigida Griff. - eastern India
 Najas schweinfurthii Magnus - Senegal, Cameroon, Ethiopia, Sudan, Tanzania 
 Najas tenuicaulis Miki - Honshu Island in Japan
 Najas tenuifolia R.Br. - Hong Kong, Southeast Asia, Australia
 Najas tenuis Magnus – India, Sri Lanka, Myanmar
 Najas tenuissima (A.Braun ex Magnus) Magnus - Finland, Russia, Hokkaido
 Najas testui Rendle - western + central Africa
 Najas welwitschii Rendle - tropical Africa, western India
 Najas wrightiana A.Braun - Mexico, Central America, Cuba, Bahamas, Venezuela; naturalized in Florida

References

External links
 Najadaceae  in L. Watson and M.J. Dallwitz (1992 onwards) [http://delta-intkey.com/angio/ The families of flowering plants] : descriptions, illustrations, identification, information retrieval. Version: 9 March 2006. http://delta-intkey.com .
Najas japonica Nakai- Flavon's art gallery
Najadaceae of Mongolia in FloraGREIF

 
Aquatic plants
Hydrocharitaceae genera
Taxa named by Carl Linnaeus